Helenowo-Gadomiec  is a settlement in the administrative district of Gmina Przasnysz, within Przasnysz County, Masovian Voivodeship, in east-central Poland. It is most famous for its cheese.

References

Helenowo-Gadomiec